Yanam Tigers was a franchise volleyball team based in Yanam, Puducherry that played in the Indian Volley League. The team was founded in 2011. Yanam Tigers finished third in  the first edition, in 2011.

Home stadium 

YSR Indoor Stadium was the home stadium of Yanam Tigers.

Matches played

2011 Indian Volley League 

This is a list of Matches played by Yanam Tiger in 2011 Indian Volley League.

At Bangalore 

|}

At Chennai 

|}

At Yanam 

|}

At Hyderabad 

|}

External links 
 Yanam Government
 Volleyball Federation of India

References

Volleyball in India
2011 establishments in Puducherry
Sport in Puducherry